Lawrence Cohen Walker Jr. (born March 9, 1942) is an American attorney and former politician who served sixteen terms in the Georgia House of Representatives. He was appointed administration floor leader for Governor Joe Frank Harris in 1983 and House Majority Leader in 1986.

References

External links
 
 Profile at Walker Hulbert Gray & Moore, LLP

|-

|-

|-

|-

Georgia (U.S. state) Democrats
20th-century American politicians
21st-century American politicians
People from Perry, Georgia
Living people
1942 births